The Shonkin Sag is a prehistoric fluvioglacial landform located along the northern edge of the Highwood Mountains in the state of Montana in the United States. The Sag is a river channel formed by the Missouri River and glacial meltwater pouring from Glacial Lake Great Falls. It is one of the most famous prehistoric meltwater channels in the world.

Location and size

Shonkin Sag is located in central Montana. Shallow glacial lakes may still be found along the now-dry channel.

The sag is named for the town of Shonkin, Montana, settled in the 1870s. The name "Shonkin" is allegedly the Blackfeet word for the Highwood Mountains, or an adulteration of one of the town's early settlers, John Shonk.

Formation
Prior to the Quaternary glaciation, the Missouri River drained to the northeast into a terminal lake or Hudson Bay. During the last glacial period about 17,000 to 13,000 years ago, the Laurentide Ice Sheet blocked the Missouri River and created Glacial Lake Great Falls.

About 15,000 years ago, a glacial lake outburst flood occurred. These waters and their attendant debris then carved the Shonkin Sag at right angles across the existing drainage valleys, with the ice sheet forming the northern edge of the channel. Once the ice sheet retreated, the Shonkin Sag continued to provide a channel for water draining from Glacial Lake Great Falls and the Missouri River, albeit at a much slower rate and at a lower level.

Laccolith
A laccolith is an igneous intrusion injected between two layers of sedimentary rock. Significant amounts of syenite and shonkinite can be found in the laccolith. The Shonkin Sag laccolith is cited by geologists as a classic example of igneous differentiation in a single igneous intrusion.

Railroad Grade
Part of the North Montana line of the Chicago, Milwaukee, St. Paul and Pacific Railroad was constructed  within Shonkin Sag (see photo above).

Notes

External links
"The Shonkin Sag: An In-Depth Excursion Along the East Side of the Highwood Mountains." Gerald T. Davidson, PhD - Personal Web site conducting a geological trip along the Shonkin Sag by a noted physicist

Geology of Montana
Glacial landforms
Former rivers